

Regenbogen (German for "rainbow") may refer to:

People
Otto Regenbogen (1891-1966) German linguist and scholar

Music
Regenbogen, album by Dana Winner 1993
Regenbogen, album by Vanessa Mai 2017
"Regenbogen", song by Wincent Weiss 2015
 Radio Regenbogen Elmar Hörig

Military
Operation Regenbogen (disambiguation)
Operation Regenbogen (Arctic)
Operation Regenbogen (U-boat)

Other
First Camp German stock-listed company Regenbogen AG